Bošáca is a village and municipality in Nové Mesto nad Váhom District in the Trenčín Region of western Slovakia.

Etymology
The name is derived from an adjective bosý (in Slovak but also in some other Slavic languages - barefoot, bosáci - barefooted, poor people, hist. Bośáci > Bošáci).

History
In historical records, the village was first mentioned in 1380 as Bosach.

Geography
The municipality lies at an altitude of 235 metres and covers an area of 19.598 km². It has a population of about 1342 people.

Genealogical resources

The records for genealogical research are available at the state archive "Statny 
Archiv in Bratislava, Slovakia"

 Roman Catholic church records (births/marriages/deaths): 1691-1895 (parish A)
 Lutheran church records (births/marriages/deaths): 1784-1900 (parish B)

See also
 List of municipalities and towns in Slovakia

References

External links

Municipal website
Surnames of living people in Bosaca

Villages and municipalities in Nové Mesto nad Váhom District